Petrophile axillaris is a species of flowering plant in the family Proteaceae and is endemic to southwestern Western Australia. It is a shrub with pinnately-divided, sharply-pointed leaves, and spherical heads of hairy pink or grey flowers.

Description

Taxonomy
Petrophile axillaris was first formally described in 1855 by Carl Meissner in Hooker's Journal of Botany and Kew Garden Miscellany from material collected by James Drummond. The specific epithet (axillaris) means "axillary", referring to the flowers.

Distribution and habitat
This petrophile grows in sandy or gravelly limestone soils in near-coastal areas between Geraldton and Yalgorup National Park and disjunctly in the Leeuwin-Naturaliste National Park in southwestern Western Australia.

Conservation status
Petrophile axillaris is classified as "not threatened" by the Western Australian Government Department of Parks and Wildlife.

References

axillaris
Eudicots of Western Australia
Endemic flora of Western Australia
Plants described in 1855
Taxa named by Carl Meissner